Derbyshire County Cricket Club in 1928 was the cricket season when the English club Derbyshire had been playing for 57 years. It was their thirtieth season in the County Championship, and they won six matches to finish tenth in the County Championship..

1928 season

Derbyshire played 26 games in the County Championship, and one match each against the touring West Indies, Oxford University and MCC. Their six wins were all in the 
County Championship, while they drew with Oxford University and lost to the West Indies.

Guy Jackson was in his seventh season as captain. The season saw the arrival of three players who were significant in the club's victory in the County Championship in the 1936 season, including the captain of the team Arthur Walker Richardson. Tommy Mitchell was a miner who changed to cricket as a result of the General Strike and in the next 10 years took over 1200 wickets for Derbyshire. Albert Alderman came through Sam Cadman's coaching scheme and scored over 12,000 runs for Derbyshire in the next 20 years. Two of the Hill Wood brothers Charles and Denis made their debuts and went on the play a couple of seasons for Derbyshire. Charles was at Oxford where he also played.  Cecil Tate son of Fred Tate the coach played four matches but only in the 1928 season, and subsequently went to Warwickshire.  Robin Buckston son of former captain George Buckston and George Beet son of former wicket-keeper George Beet both made single appearances as stand-in wicket-keepers in the season although Buckston returned in the 1937 season as captain.

Harry Storer was top scorer and Leslie Townsend took most wickets.

Matches

{| class="wikitable" style="width:100%;"
|-
! style="background:#efefef;" colspan="6"| List of matches
|- style="background:#efefef;"
!No.
!Date
!V
!Result 
!Margin
!Notes
|-
|1
|5 May 1928
| West Indies  County Ground, Derby 
| style="background:#f00;"|Lost
| 2 wickets
| AG Slater 8–24 
|- 
|2
| 12 May 1928  
| Glamorgan   Rutland Recreation Ground, Ilkeston 
| style="background:#fc0;"|Drawn
|
| Hills 111; Mercer 6–76; L F Townsend 6–72; Ryan 6–88 
|- 
|3
|16 May 1928
|  Sussex   County Ground, Hove 
| style="background:#fc0;"|Drawn
|
| 
|- 
|4
| 19 May 1928
| Somerset Queen's Park, Chesterfield 
| style="background:#fc0;"|Drawn
|
| Greswell 5–74 
|- 
|5
| 23 May 1928 
| Oxford University    The University Parks, Oxford 
| style="background:#fc0;"|Drawn
|
| GM Lee 5–42
|- 
|6
|26 May 1928  
| Warwickshire  County Ground, Derby 
| style="background:#f00;"|Lost
| 6 wickets
| JM Hutchinson 111; Wyatt 104
|- 
|7
|30 May 1928  
|  Northamptonshire  County Ground, Northampton 
| style="background:#f00;"|Lost
| 8 wickets
| GM Lee 155 and 5–57
|- 
|8
|2 Jun 1928  
| Essex Queen's Park, Chesterfield 
| style="background:#fc0;"|Drawn
|
| T S Worthington 133 
|- 
|9
|6 Jun 1928
| MCC    Lord's Cricket Ground, St John's Wood 
| style="background:#f00;"|Lost
| 7 wickets
| T S Worthington 101; Hearne 110; Jupp 7–89 
|- 
|10
| 9 Jun 1928  
| Essex Southchurch Park, Southend-on-Sea 
| style="background:#fc0;"|Drawn
|
| 
|- 
|11
| 13 Jun 1928  
| Leicestershire College Ground, Loughborough 
| style="background:#fc0;"|Drawn
|
| T S Worthington 121; AG Slater 5–29
|- 
|12
|16 Jun 1928  
|  Northamptonshire  County Ground, Derby
| style="background:#0f0;"|Won
| Innings and 50 runs
| GR Jackson 106; 
|- 
|13
|20 Jun 1928  
| Glamorgan   Cardiff Arms Park 
| style="background:#0f0;"|Won
| 10 wickets
| AG Slater 5–53; GM Lee 6–44
|- 
|14
|23 Jun 1928  
| Worcestershire  Queen's Park, Chesterfield 
| style="background:#0f0;"|Won
| Innings and 10 runs
| AG Slater 7–40 
|- 
|15
| 27 Jun 1928  
| Gloucestershire  Rutland Recreation Ground, Ilkeston 
| style="background:#fc0;"|Drawn
|
| H Storer 167 
|- 
|16
| 7 Jul 1928
| Kent  Queen's Park, Chesterfield 
| style="background:#f00;"|Lost
| 6 wickets
| H Storer 113; GM Lee 100; Hardinge 152; Freeman 6–71 and 6–125; T S Worthington 8–41
|- 
|17
| 11 Jul 1928  
| Yorkshire  County Ground, Derby 
| style="background:#f00;"|Lost
| Innings and 52 runs
| Sutcliffe 111; Leyland 149; Macaulay 5–76
|- 
|18
|21 Jul 1928
| Kent  Mote Park, Maidstone 
| style="background:#fc0;"|Drawn
|
| Crawley 109; Woolley 198
|- 
|19
| 25 Jul 1928
| Somerset County Ground, Taunton 
| style="background:#0f0;"|Won
| 4 wickets
| CKH Hill-Wood 5–76
|- 
|20
|28 Jul 1928  
| Gloucestershire  Greenbank, Bristol 
| style="background:#fc0;"|Drawn
|
| Hammond 134; Sinfield 5–78 
|- 
|21
| 1 Aug 1928
|  Sussex   Queen's Park, Chesterfield 
| style="background:#fc0;"|Drawn
|
| Bowley 104 and 6–106; L F Townsend 8–48 and 5–63
|- 
|22
| 4 Aug 1928  
| Warwickshire  Edgbaston, Birmingham 
| style="background:#fc0;"|Drawn
|
| Quaife 115; Parsons 114; Durnell 5–63
|- 
|23
| 8 Aug 1928  
| Worcestershire  Chester Road North Ground, Kidderminster 
| style="background:#0f0;"|Won
| 2 wickets
| L F Townsend 6–84; Root 6–107 and 5–61; GM Lee 5–99 
|- 
|24
|11 Aug 1928  
| Leicestershire County Ground, Derby 
| style="background:#0f0;"|Won
| 242 runs
| GM Lee 107 and 5–31; T S Worthington 5–39
|- 
|25
|15 Aug 1928  
| Yorkshire  Dewsbury and Savile Ground 
| style="background:#f00;"|Lost
| Innings and 22 runs
| Sutcliffe 138; Rhodes 7–55; Bedford 6–91 
|- 
|26
| 18 Aug 1928  
|  Nottinghamshire Rutland Recreation Ground, Ilkeston 
| style="background:#fc0;"|Drawn
|
| Whysall 157; Barratt 5–62 
|- 
|27
|25 Aug 1928  
|  Nottinghamshire Trent Bridge, Nottingham 
| style="background:#fc0;"|Drawn
|
| Larwood 5–26 
|- 
|28
|29 Aug 1928  
|Lancashire  Stanley Park, Blackpool 
| style="background:#fc0;"|Drawn
|
| Watson 122; Hallows 117; Hopwood 5–71
|- 
|29
|1 Sep 1928  
|Lancashire  The Town Ground, Burton-on-Trent 
| style="background:#f00;"|Lost
| Innings and 49 runs
| T S Worthington 6–83 
|-

Statistics

County Championship batting averages

(a) Figures adjusted for non CC matches

County Championship bowling averages

Wicket keeping

Harry Elliott Catches 43 Stumping 19 (Elliott retired hurt in the MCC match and was absent from two other matches)
George Beet, Jr. (Kent 21 July) Catches 3, Stumping 1
Harry Storer (MCC ) Catches 2, Stumping 1
Robin Buckston (Lancs 1 Sept) Catches 1, Stumping 1
Jim Hutchinson (Lancs 29 Aug) Catches 12 Stumping 1

See also
Derbyshire County Cricket Club seasons
1928 English cricket season

References

1928 in English cricket
Derbyshire County Cricket Club seasons
English cricket seasons in the 20th century